"1979" is a song by American alternative rock band the Smashing Pumpkins. It was released in 1996 as the second single from their third studio album, Mellon Collie and the Infinite Sadness. "1979" was written by frontman Billy Corgan, and features loops and samples uncharacteristic of previous Smashing Pumpkins songs. The song was written as a nostalgic coming-of-age story by Corgan. In the year 1979, Corgan was twelve, and this is what he considered his transition into adolescence.

"1979" reached number two in Canada and Iceland, number six in Ireland, number nine in New Zealand, and number 12 in the United States. It charted within the top 20 in several other countries, including Australia and the United Kingdom. The song was nominated for the Record of the Year and Best Rock Performance by a Duo or Group with Vocal at the 39th Annual Grammy Awards, and won an MTV Video Music Award for Best Alternative Video. In 2012, it was voted the second-best Smashing Pumpkins song by Rolling Stone readers.

Recording 
According to statements in interviews, Corgan worked nonstop after the Siamese Dream tour and wrote about 56 songs for Mellon Collie and the Infinite Sadness, the last of which was "1979". As the Mellon Collie sessions came to a conclusion, "1979" (which evolved out of a demo called "Strolling") was just a couple of chord changes and a snippet of a melody without words. When the time came to choose the songs that were to appear on the album, producer Flood said that the song was "not good enough" and wanted to drop it from the record. Taking it as a challenge inspired Corgan, and he wrote "1979" that night in about four hours. The next day, Flood heard "1979" once and decided immediately to put it on the album. Corgan considers "1979" the most personally important song on Mellon Collie.

The song features a sample of Corgan's voice repeated throughout. During recording, Corgan was singing "today" as the melody line, so he and Flood decided to record him singing to a tape. The pair electronically manipulated several samples and looped them against a drumbeat. "1979" is partly influenced by "Pleasure", an unreleased song by the Frogs, whom Corgan had liked after seeing them perform in Madison, WI, in 1993. Corgan later performed during the band's encore at Lollapalooza in the summer of 1994, and Dennis Flemion of the Frogs would replace recently deceased keyboard player Jonathan Melvoin during the Infinite Sadness tour.

Reception 
"1979" is the Smashing Pumpkins' highest-charting single, reaching number 12 on the Billboard Hot 100 and number one on the Mainstream Rock Tracks and on the Modern Rock Tracks charts. Virgin credited the inclusion of the single's bonus tracks for driving sales. The song was nominated for the Record of the Year and Best Rock Performance by a Duo or Group with Vocal at the 1997 Grammy Awards. Pitchfork Media included the song at number 21 on their "Top 200 Tracks of the 90s" and said "'1979' was Billy Corgan asking, 'You know this feeling?' and the second you heard that guitar line the immediate answer was, 'I do-- tell me more.'"

In a 1996 Spin interview, Corgan indicated that "1979" was probably the only indication he had for what the next Pumpkins album would sound like, "something that combines technology, and a rock sensibility, and pop, and whatever, and hopefully clicks. Between 'Bullet with Butterfly Wings' and '1979' you have the bookends of Mellon Collie and the Infinite Sadness. You've literally [heard] the end of the rock thing, and the beginning of the new thing".

In Australia, the song was voted number 13 on Triple J Hottest 100 in 1996. It was later voted number 71 on the Hottest 100 of All Time in 1998, number 35 on the Triple J Hottest 100 of All Time in 2009, and number 21 on the Hottest 100 of the Past 20 Years in 2013.

Music video 
The music video for "1979" was directed by the team of Jonathan Dayton and Valerie Faris, who had previously directed the music video for "Rocket". Originally, the band approached another director (possibly Spike Jonze) to film the video for "1979". His idea was that all the band members were residents in an alien hotel and they were all going to have specially made alien-elephant masks. This video would have cost over a million dollars.

The video follows a day in the life of disaffected suburban teenagers driving around in a 1972 Dodge Charger. It is based on a concept Corgan created, featuring an idealized version of teenage life, while also trying to capture the feeling of being bored in the Chicago suburbs, where Corgan grew up. In the video the Dodge Charger has Illinois license plates, although in the driving scenes the mountains of California are visible in the background shots. Originally, Corgan wanted a scene of violence, in which the convenience store was trashed by the teens at the end of the video, but Dayton and Faris convinced him to go for something tamer. Aside from Corgan appearing throughout the video in the backseat of a car, the other band members had small parts in the video; James Iha appears as a convenience store clerk, D'arcy Wretzky as an irate neighbor, Jimmy Chamberlin as a policeman, and all three of them appear together as the band in the party scene. Band manager "Gooch" plays Jimmy's partner.

Upon finishing the video shoot, the band flew to New York to perform. However, all tapes of the footage were accidentally left sitting on top of a car, and were lost as the driver departed. The group later flew back to re-shoot the party scene.

The "1979" video was highly acclaimed. It won the MTV Video Music Award for Best Alternative Video in 1996. It was one of Canadian cable television music channel MuchMusic's Countdown number-one videos of 1996. Billy Corgan considers it the Pumpkins' best video, calling it "the closest we've ever come to realizing everything we wanted."

The video for the 1998 song "Perfect" is a sequel to this one, and involves the same characters who are now older. The aforementioned incident with the loss of the original footage is parodied in one of the later video's final scenes, in which a cassette tape is left on top of a car and falls off as a character drives out of a parking lot at high speed, and is subsequently destroyed by another vehicle.

Track listings 
UK and US CD single, UK 12-inch vinyl

1996 maxi-CD re-issue

US 7-inch double A-side single

1979 Mixes

Tracks 1, 2, and 4 are remixed by Roli Mosimann. Track 3 is remixed by Moby.

Charts

Weekly charts

Year-end charts

Certifications

Release history

Licensed uses 

The song is used in Clerks II and during the credits of Gran Turismo 5. It was also released as downloadable content for Guitar Hero World Tour. It was also part of the soundtrack of Grand Theft Auto IV as part of the fictional Liberty Rock Radio station until April 2018 when Rockstar Games' ten-year license to the song expired. The song's guitar riff was also interpolated by American boy band Why Don't We in their song "Slow Down".

See also 

 Number one modern rock hits of 1996
 List of number-one mainstream rock hits (United States)
 List of RPM Rock/Alternative number-one singles (Canada)

References

External links
 

1995 songs
1996 singles
The Smashing Pumpkins songs
Art rock songs
Alternative pop songs
Pop ballads
Hut Records singles
Music videos directed by Jonathan Dayton and Valerie Faris
Song recordings produced by Alan Moulder
Song recordings produced by Billy Corgan
Song recordings produced by Flood (producer)
Songs about nostalgia
Songs written by Billy Corgan